Tapinoma glaesaria is an extinct species of ant in the genus Tapinoma. Originally described by Gennady Dlussky in 2002 as Tapinoma aberrans, fossils of the species were found in the Rovno amber in Ukraine. The original specific name was a secondary homonym of Tapinoma aberrans (Santschi, 1911), an extant species from Madagascar. Perrichot, Salas-Gismondi & Antoine (2019) coined a replacement name T. glaesaria for the taxon described by Dlussky.

References

†
Fossil ant taxa
Prehistoric life of Europe
Hymenoptera of Europe
Fossil taxa described in 2002
Rovno amber